Abdoulaye Seye (30 July 1934 – 13 October 2011) was a Senegalese sprinter. He competed for France at the 1960 Olympics in the 100 m, 200 m and 4 × 100 m relay events and won a bronze medal in the 200 m. Although Senegal had received its independence from France two months ahead of the Olympics as part of the short-lived Mali Federation, in 1960 it still competed as part of France. Seye also won the 100 m gold medal at the 1959 Mediterranean Games.

As a teenager Seye played football for the club Foyer France Senegal, and focused on sprint running only in 1954, during his national service in Toulon. He later won French national titles in the 100 m (1959) and 200 m (1956, 1959) and set national records in the 100 m (1959), 200 m (1959, 1960) and 400 m (1959, 1960).

In 1961, Seye founded the Olympic Committee of Senegal. Between 1961 and 1965 he was the head coach of the national athletics team and later served as adviser to the Senegalese Ministry of Sports.

References

1934 births
2011 deaths
Senegalese male sprinters
French male sprinters
Olympic bronze medalists for France
Athletes (track and field) at the 1960 Summer Olympics
Olympic athletes of France
French sportspeople of Senegalese descent
People of French West Africa
Medalists at the 1960 Summer Olympics
FIBA Hall of Fame inductees
Olympic bronze medalists in athletics (track and field)
Mediterranean Games gold medalists for France
Athletes (track and field) at the 1959 Mediterranean Games
Mediterranean Games medalists in athletics
Sportspeople from Saint-Louis, Senegal